Karel Camrda (born 26 October 1964) is a Czech former cyclo-cross cyclist. He most notably won the amateur race at the 1988 UCI Cyclo-cross World Championships and a silver medal in the elite race at the 1992 UCI Cyclo-cross World Championships. He was also awarded the Czechoslovak Cyclist of the Year in 1992.

Major results
1987–1988
 1st  UCI Amateur Cyclo-cross World Championships
 3rd National Cyclo-cross Championships
1988–1989
 1st  National Cyclo-cross Championships
1989–1990
 8th UCI Cyclo-cross World Championships
1990–1991
 2nd National Cyclo-cross Championships
 8th Overall Superprestige
1991–1992
 2nd  UCI Cyclo-cross World Championships

References

External links
 

1964 births
Living people
People from Tábor
Cyclo-cross cyclists
Czech male cyclists
Sportspeople from the South Bohemian Region